Phalaenopsis × veitchiana is a species of orchid endemic to the Philippines. It is a hybrid of Phalaenopsis equestris and Phalaenopsis schilleriana. It occurs naturally and has also been artificially re-created. It is named after the British horticulturalist Harry J. Veitch.

References 

veitchiana
Orchid hybrids
Hybrid plants
Plant nothospecies
Interspecific plant hybrids